The 83rd United States Congress was a meeting of the legislative branch of the federal government of the United States in Washington, D.C. from January 3, 1953, until January 3, 1955, during the last two weeks of the Truman administration, with the remainder spanning the first two years of Dwight Eisenhower's presidency. It was composed of the Senate and the House of Representatives. The apportionment of seats in the House was based on the 1950 U.S. census.

The Republicans gained the majority in both chambers, winning back full control of Congress for the first time since the 80th Congress in 1947, and with Dwight Eisenhower being sworn in as president on January 20, 1953, this gave the Republicans an overall federal government trifecta for the first time since the 71st Congress in 1929.

Major events 

 January 20, 1953: Dwight Eisenhower is sworn in as President of the United States in his first inauguration
 March 1, 1954: U.S. Capitol shooting incident
 December 2, 1954: Joseph McCarthy is censured by the U.S. Senate

Major legislation 

 July 3, 1953: Small Business Act, ch. 282, 
 August 7, 1953: Refugee Relief Act, 
 August 7, 1953: Submerged Lands Act, ch. 345, 
 August 14, 1953: Public Law 280, 
 May 13, 1954: Saint Lawrence Seaway Act, ch. 201, 
 August 12, 1954: Federal National Mortgage Association Charter Act, ch. 649, title II, §201, 
 August 13, 1954: Multiple Mineral Development Act, ch. 730, 
 August 16, 1954: Internal Revenue Code of 1954, ch. 736, 
 Federal Unemployment Tax Act, §1(d), 
 National Firearms Act, §1(d), 
 August 24, 1954: Communist Control Act of 1954, ch. 886, 
 August 30, 1954: Atomic Energy Act of 1954, 
 1954: Agricultural Act of 1954
 1954: Water Facilities Act of 1954

Party summary

Senate

House of Representatives

Leadership

Senate  
 President: Alben W. Barkley (D), until January 20, 1953
 Richard Nixon (R), from January 20, 1953
 President pro tempore: Styles Bridges (R)

Majority (Republican) leadership  
 Majority Leader: Robert A. Taft, until July 31, 1953 (died)
 William Knowland, from August 3, 1953
 Majority Whip: Leverett Saltonstall
 Republican Conference Chairman: Eugene Millikin
 Republican Conference Secretary: Milton Young
 National Senatorial Committee Chair: Everett Dirksen
 Policy Committee Chairman: Homer S. Ferguson

Minority (Democratic) leadership  
 Minority Leader and Conference Chairman: Lyndon B. Johnson
 Minority Whip: Earle Clements
 Democratic Caucus Secretary: Thomas C. Hennings Jr.

House of Representatives  
 Speaker: Joseph W. Martin Jr. (R)

Majority (Republican) leadership  
 Majority Leader: Charles A. Halleck
 Majority Whip: Leslie C. Arends
 Republican Conference Chairman: Clifford R. Hope
 Policy Committee Chairman: Joseph W. Martin Jr.
 Republican Campaign Committee Chairman: Richard M. Simpson

Minority (Democratic) leadership  
 Minority Leader: Sam Rayburn
 Minority Whip: John W. McCormack
 Democratic Caucus Chairman: Wilbur Mills
 Democratic Caucus Secretary: Edna F. Kelly
 Democratic Campaign Committee Chairman: Michael J. Kirwan

Caucuses 

 House Democratic Caucus
 Senate Democratic Caucus

Members

Senate 
Senators are popularly elected statewide every six years, with one-third beginning new six-year terms with each Congress. Within each state, senators are listed in order of seniority. Preceding the names in the list below are Senate class numbers, which indicate the cycle of their election, In this Congress, Class 2 meant their term ended with this Congress, facing re-election in 1954; Class 3 meant their term began in the last Congress, facing re-election in 1956; and Class 1 meant their term began in this Congress, facing re-election in 1958.

Alabama 
 2. John Sparkman (D)
 3. J. Lister Hill (D)

Arizona 
 1. Barry Goldwater (R)
 3. Carl Hayden (D)

Arkansas 
 2. John L. McClellan (D)
 3. J. William Fulbright (D)

California 
 1. William Knowland (R)
 3. Thomas Kuchel (R)

Colorado 
 2. Edwin C. Johnson (D)
 3. Eugene Millikin (R)

Connecticut 
 1. William A. Purtell (R)
 3. Prescott Bush (R)

Delaware 
 1. John J. Williams (R)
 2. J. Allen Frear Jr. (D)

Florida 
 1. Spessard Holland (D)
 3. George Smathers (D)

Georgia 
 2. Richard Russell Jr. (D)
 3. Walter F. George (D)

Idaho 
 2. Henry Dworshak (R)
 3. Herman Welker (R)

Illinois 
 2. Paul Douglas (D)
 3. Everett Dirksen (R)

Indiana 
 1. William E. Jenner (R)
 3. Homer E. Capehart (R)

Iowa 
 2. Guy Gillette (D)
 3. Bourke B. Hickenlooper (R)

Kansas 
 2. Andrew Frank Schoeppel (R)
 3. Frank Carlson (R)

Kentucky 
 2. John Sherman Cooper (R)
 3. Earle Clements (D)

Louisiana 
 2. Allen J. Ellender (D)
 3. Russell B. Long (D)

Maine 
 1. Frederick G. Payne (R)
 2. Margaret Chase Smith (R)

Maryland 
 1. James Glenn Beall (R)
 3. John Marshall Butler (R)

Massachusetts 
 1. John F. Kennedy (D)
 2. Leverett Saltonstall (R)

Michigan 
 1. Charles E. Potter (R)
 2. Homer S. Ferguson (R)

Minnesota 
 1. Edward John Thye (R)
 2. Hubert Humphrey (DFL)

Mississippi 
 1. John C. Stennis (D)
 2. James Eastland (D)

Missouri 
 1. Stuart Symington (D)
 3. Thomas C. Hennings Jr. (D)

Montana 
 1. Mike Mansfield (D)
 2. James E. Murray (D)

Nebraska 
 1. Hugh A. Butler (R), until July 1, 1954
 Samuel W. Reynolds (R), July 3, 1954 – November 7, 1954
 Roman Hruska (R), from November 8, 1954
 2. Dwight Griswold (R), until April 12, 1954
 Eva Bowring (R), April 16, 1954 – November 7, 1954
 Hazel Abel (R), November 8, 1954 – December 31, 1954
 Carl Curtis (R), from January 1, 1955

Nevada 
 1. George W. Malone (R)
 3. Pat McCarran (D), until September 28, 1954
 Ernest S. Brown (R), October 1, 1954 – December 1, 1954
 Alan Bible (D), from December 2, 1954

New Hampshire 
 2. Styles Bridges (R)
 3. Charles W. Tobey (R), until July 24, 1953
 Robert W. Upton (R), August 14, 1953 – November 7, 1954
 Norris Cotton (R), from November 8, 1954

New Jersey 
 1. Howard Alexander Smith (R)
 2. Robert C. Hendrickson (R)

New Mexico  
 1. Dennis Chávez (D)
 2. Clinton Anderson (D)

New York  
 1. Irving Ives (R)
 3. Herbert H. Lehman (D)

North Carolina 
 2. Willis Smith (D), until June 26, 1953
 Alton Lennon (D), July 10, 1953 – November 28, 1954
 W. Kerr Scott (D), from November 29, 1954
 3. Clyde R. Hoey (D), until May 12, 1954
 Sam Ervin (D), from June 5, 1954

North Dakota 
 1. William Langer (R-NPL)
 3. Milton Young (R)

Ohio 
 1. John W. Bricker (R)
 3. Robert A. Taft (R), until July 31, 1953
 Thomas A. Burke (D), November 10, 1953 – December 2, 1954
 George H. Bender (R), from December 16, 1954

Oklahoma 
 2. Robert S. Kerr (D)
 3. Mike Monroney (D)

Oregon 
 2. Guy Cordon (R)
 3. Wayne Morse (I)

Pennsylvania 
 1. Edward Martin (R)
 3. James H. Duff (R)

Rhode Island 
 1. John Pastore (D)
 2. Theodore F. Green (D)

South Carolina 
 2. Burnet R. Maybank (D), until September 1, 1954
 Charles E. Daniel (D), September 6, 1954 – December 23, 1954
 Strom Thurmond (D), from December 24, 1954
 3. Olin D. Johnston (D)

South Dakota 
 2. Karl E. Mundt (R)
 3. Francis H. Case (R)

Tennessee 
 1. Albert Gore Sr. (D)
 2. Estes Kefauver (D)

Texas 
 1. Price Daniel (D)
 2. Lyndon B. Johnson (D)

Utah 
 1. Arthur Vivian Watkins (R)
 3. Wallace F. Bennett (R)

Vermont 
 1. Ralph Flanders (R)
 3. George Aiken (R)

Virginia 
 1. Harry F. Byrd (D)
 2. Absalom Willis Robertson (D)

Washington 
 1. Henry M. Jackson (D)
 3. Warren Magnuson (D)

West Virginia 
 1. Harley M. Kilgore (D)
 2. Matthew M. Neely (D)

Wisconsin 
 1. Joseph McCarthy (R)
 3. Alexander Wiley (R)

Wyoming 
 1. Frank A. Barrett (R)
 2. Lester C. Hunt (D), until June 19, 1954
 Edward D. Crippa (R), June 24, 1954 – November 28, 1954
 Joseph C. O'Mahoney (D), from November 29, 1954

House of Representatives

Alabama 
 . Frank W. Boykin (D)
 . George M. Grant (D)
 . George W. Andrews (D)
 . Kenneth A. Roberts (D)
 . Albert Rains (D)
 . Armistead I. Selden Jr. (D)
 . Carl Elliott (D)
 . Robert E. Jones Jr. (D)
 . Laurie C. Battle (D)

Arizona 
 . John Jacob Rhodes (R)
 . Harold Patten (D)

Arkansas 
 . Ezekiel C. Gathings (D)
 . Wilbur Mills (D)
 . James William Trimble (D)
 . Oren Harris (D)
 . Brooks Hays (D)
 . William F. Norrell (D)

California 
 . Hubert B. Scudder (R)
 . Clair Engle (D)
 . John E. Moss (D)
 . William S. Mailliard (R)
 . John F. Shelley (D)
 . Robert Condon (D)
 . John J. Allen Jr. (R)
 . George P. Miller (D)
 . J. Arthur Younger (R)
 . Charles Gubser (R)
 . J. Leroy Johnson (R)
 . Allan O. Hunter (R)
 . Ernest K. Bramblett (R)
 . Harlan Hagen (D)
 . Gordon L. McDonough (R)
 . Donald L. Jackson (R)
 . Cecil R. King (D)
 . Craig Hosmer (R)
 . Chester E. Holifield (D)
 . John Carl Hinshaw (R)
 . Edgar W. Hiestand (R)
 . Joseph F. Holt (R)
 . Clyde Doyle (D)
 . Norris Poulson (R), until June 11, 1953
 Glenard P. Lipscomb (R), from November 10, 1953
 . Patrick J. Hillings (R)
 . Sam Yorty (D)
 . Harry R. Sheppard (D)
 . James B. Utt (R)
 . John R. Phillips (R)
 . Bob Wilson (R)

Colorado 
 . Byron G. Rogers (D)
 . William S. Hill (R)
 . John Chenoweth (R)
 . Wayne N. Aspinall (D)

Connecticut 
 . Antoni Sadlak (R)
 . Thomas J. Dodd (D)
 . Horace Seely-Brown Jr. (R)
 . Albert W. Cretella (R)
 . Albert P. Morano (R)
 . James T. Patterson (R)

Delaware 
 . Herbert Warburton (R)

Florida 
 . Courtney W. Campbell (D)
 . Charles E. Bennett (D)
 . Bob Sikes (D)
 . Bill Lantaff (D)
 . Syd Herlong (D)
 . Dwight L. Rogers (D), until December 1, 1954
 . James A. Haley (D)
 . Donald Ray Matthews (D)

Georgia 
 . Prince Hulon Preston Jr. (D)
 . J. L. Pilcher (D), from February 4, 1953
 . Tic Forrester (D)
 . Albert Sidney Camp (D), until July 24, 1954
 John Flynt (D), from November 2, 1954
 . James C. Davis (D)
 . Carl Vinson (D)
 . Henderson Lovelace Lanham (D)
 . William McDonald Wheeler (D)
 . Phillip M. Landrum (D)
 . Paul Brown (D)

Idaho 
 . Gracie Pfost (D)
 . Hamer H. Budge (R)

Illinois 
 . William L. Dawson (D)
 . Barratt O'Hara (D)
 . Fred E. Busbey (R)
 . William E. McVey (R)
 . John C. Kluczynski (D)
 . Thomas J. O'Brien (D)
 . James Bowler (D), from July 7, 1953
 . Thomas S. Gordon (D)
 . Sidney R. Yates (D)
 . Richard W. Hoffman (R)
 . Timothy P. Sheehan (R)
 . Edgar A. Jonas (R)
 . Marguerite S. Church (R)
 . Chauncey W. Reed (R)
 . Noah M. Mason (R)
 . Leo E. Allen (R)
 . Leslie C. Arends (R)
 . Harold H. Velde (R)
 . Robert B. Chiperfield (R)
 . Sid Simpson (R)
 . Peter F. Mack Jr. (D)
 . William L. Springer (R)
 . Charles W. Vursell (R)
 . Melvin Price (D)
 . C. W. Bishop (R)

Indiana 
 . Ray Madden (D)
 . Charles A. Halleck (R)
 . Shepard J. Crumpacker Jr. (R)
 . E. Ross Adair (R)
 . John V. Beamer (R)
 . Cecil M. Harden (R)
 . William G. Bray (R)
 . D. Bailey Merrill (R)
 . Earl Wilson (R)
 . Ralph Harvey (R)
 . Charles B. Brownson (R)

Iowa 
 . Thomas E. Martin (R)
 . Henry O. Talle (R)
 . H. R. Gross (R)
 . Karl M. LeCompte (R)
 . Paul Cunningham (R)
 . James I. Dolliver (R)
 . Ben F. Jensen (R)
 . Charles B. Hoeven (R)

Kansas 
 . Howard Shultz Miller (D)
 . Errett P. Scrivner (R)
 . Myron V. George (R)
 . Edward Herbert Rees (R)
 . Clifford R. Hope (R)
 . Wint Smith (R)

Kentucky 
 . Noble J. Gregory (D)
 . Garrett Withers (D), until April 30, 1953
 William Natcher (D), from August 1, 1953
 . John M. Robsion Jr. (R)
 . Frank Chelf (D)
 . Brent Spence (D)
 . John C. Watts (D)
 . Carl D. Perkins (D)
 . James S. Golden (R)

Louisiana 
 . F. Edward Hébert (D)
 . Hale Boggs (D)
 . Edwin E. Willis (D)
 . Overton Brooks (D)
 . Otto Passman (D)
 . James H. Morrison (D)
 . T. Ashton Thompson (D)
 . George S. Long (D)

Maine 
 . Robert Hale (R)
 . Charles P. Nelson (R)
 . Clifford McIntire (R)

Maryland 
 . Edward Tylor Miller (R)
 . James Devereux (R)
 . Edward Garmatz (D)
 . George Hyde Fallon (D)
 . Frank Small Jr. (R)
 . DeWitt Hyde (R)
 . Samuel Friedel (D)

Massachusetts 
 . John W. Heselton (R)
 . Edward Boland (D)
 . Philip J. Philbin (D)
 . Harold Donohue (D)
 . Edith Nourse Rogers (R)
 . William H. Bates (R)
 . Thomas J. Lane (D)
 . Angier Goodwin (R)
 . Donald W. Nicholson (R)
 . Laurence Curtis (R)
 . Tip O'Neill (D)
 . John W. McCormack (D)
 . Richard B. Wigglesworth (R)
 . Joseph W. Martin Jr. (R)

Michigan 
 . Thaddeus M. Machrowicz (D)
 . George Meader (R)
 . Paul W. Shafer (R), until August 17, 1954
 . Clare Hoffman (R)
 . Gerald Ford (R)
 . Kit Clardy (R)
 . Jesse P. Wolcott (R)
 . Alvin Morell Bentley (R)
 . Ruth Thompson (R)
 . Elford Albin Cederberg (R)
 . Victor A. Knox (R)
 . John B. Bennett (R)
 . George D. O'Brien (D)
 . Louis C. Rabaut (D)
 . John Dingell Sr. (D)
 . John Lesinski Jr. (D)
 . Charles G. Oakman (R)
 . George Anthony Dondero (R)

Minnesota 
 . August H. Andresen (R)
 . Joseph P. O'Hara (R)
 . Roy Wier (DFL)
 . Eugene McCarthy (DFL)
 . Walter Judd (R)
 . Fred Marshall (DFL)
 . Herman Carl Andersen (R)
 . John Blatnik (DFL)
 . Harold Hagen (R)

Mississippi 
 . Thomas Abernethy (D)
 . Jamie Whitten (D)
 . Frank Ellis Smith (D)
 . John Bell Williams (D)
 . W. Arthur Winstead (D)
 . William M. Colmer (D)

Missouri 
 . Frank M. Karsten (D)
 . Thomas B. Curtis (R)
 . Leonor Sullivan (D)
 . Jeffrey Paul Hillelson (R)
 . Richard Walker Bolling (D)
 . William Clay Cole (R)
 . Dewey Jackson Short (R)
 . A. S. J. Carnahan (D)
 . Clarence Cannon (D)
 . Paul C. Jones (D)
 . Morgan M. Moulder (D)

Montana 
 . Lee Metcalf (D)
 . Wesley A. D'Ewart (R)

Nebraska 
 . Carl Curtis (R), until December 31, 1954
 . Roman Hruska (R), until November 8, 1954
 . Robert Dinsmore Harrison (R)
 . Arthur L. Miller (R)

Nevada 
 . Clarence Clifton Young (R)

New Hampshire 
 . Chester Earl Merrow (R)
 . Norris Cotton (R), until November 7, 1954

New Jersey 
 . Charles A. Wolverton (R)
 . T. Millet Hand (R)
 . James C. Auchincloss (R)
 . Charles R. Howell (D)
 . Peter Frelinghuysen Jr. (R)
 . Clifford P. Case (R), until August 16, 1953
 Harrison A. Williams (D), from November 3, 1953
 . William B. Widnall (R)
 . Gordon Canfield (R)
 . Frank C. Osmers Jr. (R)
 . Peter W. Rodino (D)
 . Hugh Joseph Addonizio (D)
 . Robert Kean (R)
 . Alfred Dennis Sieminski (D)
 . Edward J. Hart (D)

New Mexico 
 . John J. Dempsey (D)
 . Antonio M. Fernández (D)

New York 
 . Stuyvesant Wainwright (R)
 . Steven Derounian (R)
 . Frank J. Becker (R)
 . Henry J. Latham (R)
 . Albert H. Bosch (R)
 . Lester Holtzman (D)
 . James J. Delaney (D)
 . Louis B. Heller (D), until July 21, 1954
 . Eugene J. Keogh (D)
 . Edna F. Kelly (D)
 . Emanuel Celler (D)
 . Francis E. Dorn (R)
 . Abraham J. Multer (D)
 . John J. Rooney (D)
 . John H. Ray (R)
 . Adam Clayton Powell Jr. (D)
 . Frederic René Coudert Jr. (R)
 . James G. Donovan (D)
 . Arthur George Klein (D)
 . Franklin Delano Roosevelt Jr. (D)
 . Jacob Javits (R), until December 31, 1954
 . Sidney A. Fine (D)
 . Isidore Dollinger (D)
 . Charles A. Buckley (D)
 . Paul A. Fino (R)
 . Ralph A. Gamble (R)
 . Ralph W. Gwinn (R)
 . Katharine St. George (R)
 . J. Ernest Wharton (R)
 . Leo W. O'Brien (D)
 . Dean P. Taylor (R)
 . Bernard W. Kearney (R)
 . Clarence E. Kilburn (R)
 . William R. Williams (R)
 . R. Walter Riehlman (R)
 . John Taber (R)
 . W. Sterling Cole (R)
 . Kenneth Keating (R)
 . Harold C. Ostertag (R)
 . William E. Miller (R)
 . Edmund P. Radwan (R)
 . John R. Pillion (R)
 . Daniel A. Reed (R)

North Carolina 
 . Herbert Covington Bonner (D)
 . Lawrence H. Fountain (D)
 . Graham A. Barden (D)
 . Harold D. Cooley (D)
 . Richard Thurmond Chatham (D)
 . Carl T. Durham (D)
 . Frank Ertel Carlyle (D)
 . Charles B. Deane (D)
 . Hugh Quincy Alexander (D)
 . Charles R. Jonas (R)
 . Woodrow W. Jones (D)
 . George A. Shuford (D)

North Dakota 
 . Otto Krueger (R)
 . Usher L. Burdick (R-NPL)

Ohio 
 . Gordon H. Scherer (R)
 . William E. Hess (R)
 . Paul F. Schenck (R)
 . William Moore McCulloch (R)
 . Cliff Clevenger (R)
 . James G. Polk (D)
 . Clarence J. Brown (R)
 . Jackson Edward Betts (R)
 . Frazier Reams (I)
 . Thomas A. Jenkins (R)
 . Oliver P. Bolton (R)
 . John M. Vorys (R)
 . Alvin F. Weichel (R)
 . William Hanes Ayres (R)
 . Robert T. Secrest (D), until September 26, 1954
 . Frank T. Bow (R)
 . J. Harry McGregor (R)
 . Wayne Hays (D)
 . Michael J. Kirwan (D)
 . Michael A. Feighan (D)
 . Robert Crosser (D)
 . Frances P. Bolton (R)
 . George H. Bender (R), until December 15, 1954

Oklahoma 
 . Page Belcher (R)
 . Ed Edmondson (D)
 . Carl Albert (D)
 . Tom Steed (D)
 . John Jarman (D)
 . Victor Wickersham (D)

Oregon 
 . A. Walter Norblad (R)
 . Sam Coon (R)
 . Homer D. Angell (R)
 . Harris Ellsworth (R)

Pennsylvania 
 . William A. Barrett (D)
 . William T. Granahan (D)
 . James A. Byrne (D)
 . Earl Chudoff (D)
 . William J. Green Jr. (D)
 . Hugh Scott (R)
 . Benjamin F. James (R)
 . Karl C. King (R)
 . Paul B. Dague (R)
 . Joseph L. Carrigg (R)
 . Edward Bonin (R)
 . Ivor D. Fenton (R)
 . Samuel K. McConnell Jr. (R)
 . George M. Rhodes (D)
 . Francis E. Walter (D)
 . Walter M. Mumma (R)
 . Alvin Bush (R)
 . Richard M. Simpson (R)
 . S. Walter Stauffer (R)
 . James E. Van Zandt (R)
 . Augustine B. Kelley (D)
 . John P. Saylor (R)
 . Leon H. Gavin (R)
 . Carroll D. Kearns (R)
 . Louis E. Graham (R)
 . Thomas E. Morgan (D)
 . James G. Fulton (R)
 . Herman P. Eberharter (D)
 . Robert J. Corbett (R)
 . Vera Buchanan (D)

Rhode Island 
 . Aime Forand (D)
 . John E. Fogarty (D)

South Carolina 
 . L. Mendel Rivers (D)
 . John J. Riley (D)
 . William Jennings Bryan Dorn (D)
 . Joseph R. Bryson (D), until March 10, 1953
 Robert T. Ashmore (D), from June 2, 1953
 . James P. Richards (D)
 . John L. McMillan (D)

South Dakota 
 . Harold Lovre (R)
 . Ellis Yarnal Berry (R)

Tennessee 
 . B. Carroll Reece (R)
 . Howard Baker Sr. (R)
 . James B. Frazier Jr. (D)
 . Joe L. Evins (D)
 . Percy Priest (D)
 . James Patrick Sutton (D)
 . Tom J. Murray (D)
 . Jere Cooper (D)
 . Clifford Davis (D)

Texas 
 . Martin Dies Jr. (D)
 . Wright Patman (D)
 . Jack Brooks (D)
 . Brady P. Gentry (D)
 . Sam Rayburn (D)
 . Joseph Franklin Wilson (D)
 . Olin E. Teague (D)
 . John Dowdy (D)
 . Albert Thomas (D)
 . Clark W. Thompson (D)
 . Homer Thornberry (D)
 . William R. Poage (D)
 . Wingate H. Lucas (D)
 . Frank N. Ikard (D)
 . John E. Lyle Jr. (D)
 . Lloyd Bentsen (D)
 . Kenneth M. Regan (D)
 . Omar Burleson (D)
 . Walter E. Rogers (D)
 . George H. Mahon (D)
 . Paul J. Kilday (D)
 . O. C. Fisher (D)

Utah 
 . Douglas R. Stringfellow (R)
 . William A. Dawson (R)

Vermont 
 . Winston L. Prouty (R)

Virginia 
 . Edward J. Robeson Jr. (D)
 . Porter Hardy Jr. (D)
 . J. Vaughan Gary (D)
 . Watkins Moorman Abbitt (D)
 . Thomas B. Stanley (D), until February 3, 1953
 William M. Tuck (D), from April 14, 1953
 . Richard Harding Poff (R)
 . Burr Harrison (D)
 . Howard W. Smith (D)
 . William C. Wampler (R)
 . Joel Broyhill (R)

Washington 
 . Donald H. Magnuson (D)
 . Thomas Pelly (R)
 . Jack Westland (R)
 . Russell V. Mack (R)
 . Hal Holmes (R)
 . Walt Horan (R)
 . Thor C. Tollefson (R)

West Virginia 
 . Bob Mollohan (D)
 . Harley Orrin Staggers (D)
 . Cleveland M. Bailey (D)
 . Will E. Neal (R)
 . Elizabeth Kee (D)
 . Robert Byrd (D)

Wisconsin 
 . Lawrence H. Smith (R)
 . Glenn Robert Davis (R)
 . Gardner R. Withrow (R)
 . Clement J. Zablocki (D)
 . Charles J. Kersten (R)
 . William Van Pelt (R)
 . Melvin Laird (R)
 . John W. Byrnes (R)
 . Merlin Hull (R), until May 17, 1953
 Lester Johnson (D), from October 13, 1953
 . Alvin O'Konski (R)

Wyoming 
 . William Henry Harrison III (R)

Non-voting members 
 . Bob Bartlett (D)
 . Joseph Rider Farrington (R), until June 19, 1954
 Mary Elizabeth Pruett Farrington (R), from July 31, 1954
 . Antonio Fernós-Isern (PPD)

Changes in membership 

The count below reflects changes from the beginning of this Congress.

Senate 

|-
| North Carolina(2)
| nowrap  | Willis Smith (D)
| Died June 26, 1953.Successor appointed July 10, 1953.
| nowrap  | Alton Lennon (D)
| July 10, 1953

|-
| New Hampshire(3)
| nowrap  | Charles W. Tobey (R)
| Died July 24, 1953.Successor appointed August 14, 1953.
| nowrap  | Robert W. Upton (R)
| August 14, 1953

|-
| Ohio(3)
| nowrap  | Robert A. Taft (R)
| Died July 31, 1953.Successor appointed November 10, 1953.
| nowrap  | Thomas A. Burke (D)
| November 10, 1953

|-
| Nebraska(2)
| nowrap  | Dwight Griswold (R)
| Died April 12, 1954.Successor appointed April 16, 1954.
| nowrap  | Eva Bowring (R)
| April 16, 1954

|-
| North Carolina(3)
| nowrap  | Clyde R. Hoey (D)
| Died May 12, 1954.Successor appointed May 12, 1954 and then elected November 2, 1954.
| nowrap  | Sam Ervin (D)
| June 5, 1954

|-
| Wyoming(2)
| nowrap  | Lester C. Hunt (D)
| Died June 19, 1954.Successor appointed June 24, 1954.
| nowrap  | Edward D. Crippa (R)
| June 24, 1954

|-
| Nebraska(1)
| nowrap  | Hugh A. Butler (R)
| Died July 1, 1954.Successor appointed July 3, 1954.
| nowrap  | Samuel W. Reynolds (R)
| July 3, 1954

|-
| South Carolina(2)
| nowrap  | Burnet R. Maybank (D)
| Died September 1, 1954.Successor appointed September 6, 1954.
| nowrap  | Charles E. Daniel (D)
| September 6, 1954

|-
| Nevada(3)
| nowrap  | Pat McCarran (D)
| Died September 28, 1954.Successor appointed October 1, 1954.
| nowrap  | Ernest S. Brown (R)
| October 1, 1954

|-
| Nebraska(1)
| nowrap  | Samuel W. Reynolds (R)
| Did not run in the special election to fill seat.Successor elected November 2, 1954.
| nowrap  | Roman Hruska (R)
| November 8, 1954

|-
| Nebraska(2)
| nowrap  | Eva Bowring (R)
| Did not run in the special election to fill seat.Successor elected November 2, 1954.
| nowrap  | Hazel Abel (R)
| November 8, 1954

|-
| New Hampshire(3)
| nowrap  | Robert W. Upton (R)
| Lost special election to fill seat.Successor elected November 2, 1954.
| nowrap  | Norris Cotton (R)
| November 8, 1954

|-
| North Carolina(2)
| nowrap  | Alton Lennon (D)
| Lost special election to fill seat.Successor elected November 2, 1954.
| nowrap  | W. Kerr Scott (D)
| November 29, 1954

|-
| Wyoming(2)
| nowrap  | Edward D. Crippa (R)
| Did not run in the special election to fill seat.Successor elected November 2, 1954.
| nowrap  | Joseph C. O'Mahoney (D)
| November 29, 1954

|-
| Nevada(3)
| nowrap  | Ernest S. Brown (R)
| Lost special election to fill seat.Successor elected November 2, 1954.
| nowrap  | Alan Bible (D)
| December 2, 1954

|-
| Ohio(3)
| nowrap  | Thomas A. Burke (D)
| Lost special election to fill seat.Successor elected November 2, 1954.
| nowrap  | George H. Bender (R)
| December 16, 1954

|-
| South Carolina(2)
| nowrap  | Charles E. Daniel (D)
| Resigned December 23, 1954.Successor appointed December 24, 1954.
| nowrap  | Strom Thurmond (D)
| December 24, 1954

|-
| Nebraska(2)
| nowrap  | Hazel Abel (R)
| Resigned December 31, 1954.Successor was appointed January 1, 1955.
| nowrap  | Carl Curtis (R)
| January 1, 1955

|}

House of Representatives 

|-
| 
| Vacant
| Rep. Edward E. Cox died during previous congress
|  nowrap | J. L. Pilcher (D)
| February 4, 1953

|-
| 
| Vacant
| Rep. Adolph J. Sabath died during previous congress
|  nowrap | James Bowler (D)
| July 7, 1953

|-
| 
|  nowrap| Thomas B. Stanley (D)
| Resigned February 3, 1953, to run for Governor of Virginia
|  nowrap | William M. Tuck (D)
| April 14, 1953

|-
| 
|  nowrap| Joseph R. Bryson (D)
| Died March 10, 1953
|  nowrap | Robert T. Ashmore (D)
| June 2, 1953

|-
| 
|  nowrap| Garrett Withers (D)
| Died April 30, 1953
|  nowrap | William Natcher (D)
| August 1, 1953

|-
| 
|  nowrap| Merlin Hull (R)
| Died May 17, 1953
|  nowrap | Lester Johnson (D)
| October 13, 1953

|-
| 
|  nowrap| Norris Poulson (R)
| Resigned June 11, 1953, after being elected Mayor of Los Angeles
|  nowrap | Glenard P. Lipscomb (R)
| November 10, 1953

|-
| 
|  nowrap| Clifford P. Case (R)
| Resigned August 16, 1953
|  nowrap | Harrison A. Williams (D)
| November 3, 1953

|-
| 
|  nowrap| Joseph Rider Farrington (R)
| Died June 19, 1954
|  nowrap | Mary Elizabeth Pruett Farrington (R)
| August 4, 1954

|-
| 
|  nowrap| Louis B. Heller (D)
| Resigned July 21, 1954, after being appointed judge of the Court of Special Sessions of New York City
| Vacant
| Not filled this term

|-
| 
|  nowrap| Albert Sidney Camp (D)
| Died July 24, 1954
|  nowrap | John Flynt (D)
| November 2, 1954

|-
| 
|  nowrap| Paul W. Shafer (R)
| Died August 17, 1954
| rowspan=8 |Vacant
| rowspan=8 |Not filled this term

|-
| 
|  nowrap| Robert T. Secrest (D)
| Resigned September 26, 1954

|-
| 
|  nowrap| Norris Cotton (R)
| Resigned November 7, 1954, after being elected to the U.S. Senate

|-
| 
|  nowrap| Roman Hruska (R)
| Resigned November 8, 1954, after being elected to the U.S. Senate

|-
| 
|  nowrap| Dwight L. Rogers (D)
| Died December 1, 1954

|-
| 
|  nowrap| George H. Bender (R)
| Resigned December 15, 1954, after being elected to the U.S. Senate

|-
| 
|  nowrap| Carl Curtis (R)
| Resigned December 31, 1954, after being elected to the U.S. Senate

|-
| 
|  nowrap| Jacob Javits (R)
| Resigned December 31, 1954, after being elected New York attorney General

|}

Committees

Senate 
 Agriculture and Forestry (Chairman: George D. Aiken; Ranking Member: Allen J. Ellender)
 Appropriations (Chairman: Styles Bridges; Ranking Member: Carl Hayden)
 Armed Services (Chairman: Leverett Saltonstall; Ranking Member: Richard B. Russell)
 Banking and Currency (Chairman: Homer E. Capehart; Ranking Member: Burnet R. Maybank)
 Censure Charges against Senator McCarthy (Select)
 Compensation of Members of Congress (Select)
 District of Columbia (Chairman: Francis Case; Ranking Member: Matthew M. Neely)
 Finance (Chairman: Eugene D. Millikin; Ranking Member: Walter F. George)
 Foreign Relations (Chairman: Alexander Wiley; Ranking Member: Walter F. George)
 Government Operations (Chairman: Joseph R. McCarthy; Ranking Member: James E. Murray)
 Interior and Insular Affairs (Chairman: Hugh Butler; Ranking Member: John L. McClellan)
 Interstate and Foreign Commerce (Chairman: Charles W. Tobey; Ranking Member: Edwin C. Johnson)
 Judiciary (Chairman: William Langer; Ranking Member: Pat McCarran)
 Labor and Public Welfare (Chairman: H. Alexander Smith; Ranking Member: James E. Murray)
 Mail Cover on Senators (Special)
 Post Office and Civil Service (Chairman: Frank Carlson; Ranking Member: Olin D. Johnston)
 Public Works (Chairman: Edward Martin; Ranking Member: Dennis Chavez)
 Rules and Administration (Chairman: William E. Jenner; Ranking Member: Carl Hayden)
 Small Business (Select) (Chairman: Edward J. Thye)
 Whole

House of Representatives 
 Agriculture (Chairman: Clifford R. Hope; Ranking Member: Carl Vinson)
 Appropriations (Chairman: John Taber; Ranking Member: Brent Spence)
 Armed Services (Chairman: Dewey Jackson Short; Ranking Member: John L. McMillan)
 Banking and Currency (Chairman: Jesse P. Wolcott; Ranking Member: Brent Spence)
 Communist Aggression (Select) (Chairman: Charles J. Kersten)
 Benefits for Dependents of Armed Services Veterans (Select)
 Defense Production 
 District of Columbia (Chairman: Sid Simpson; Ranking Member: John L. McMillan)
 Education and Labor (Chairman: Samuel K. McConnell Jr.; Ranking Member: Graham A. Barden)
 Foreign Affairs (Chairman: Robert B. Chiperfield; Ranking Member: James P. Richards)
 House Administration (Chairman: Karl M. LeCompte; Ranking Member: Omar Burleson)
 Investigate the Incorporation of the Baltic States into the U.S.S.R. (Select) (Chairman: Charles J. Kersten;)
 Interior and Insular Affairs (Chairman: Arthur L. Miller; Ranking Member: Clair Engle)
 Interstate and Foreign Commerce (Chairman: Charles A. Wolverton; Ranking Member: Robert Crosser)
 Government Operations (Chairman: Clare E. Hoffman; Ranking Member: William L. Dawson)
 Judiciary (Chairman: Chauncey W. Reed; Ranking Member: Emanuel Celler)
 Merchant Marine and Fisheries (Chairman: Alvin F. Weichel; Ranking Member: Edward J. Hart)
 Post Office and Civil Service (Chairman: Edward H. Rees; Ranking Member: Tom J. Murray)
 Public Works (Chairman: George Anthony Dondero; Ranking Member: Charles A. Buckley)
 Rules (Chairman: Leo E. Allen; Ranking Member: Howard W. Smith)
 Small Business (Select) (Chairman: William S. Hill)
 Standards of Official Conduct
 Survival Benefits (Select) (Chairman: N/A; Ranking Member: N/A)
 Un-American Activities (Chairman: Harold H. Velde; Ranking Member: Francis E. Walter)
 Veterans' Affairs (Chairman: Edith Nourse Rogers; Ranking Member: Olin E. Teague)
 Ways and Means (Chairman: Daniel A. Reed; Ranking Member: Jere Cooper)
 Whole

Joint committees 
 Atomic Energy 
 Conditions of Indian Tribes (Special)
 Disposition of Executive Papers
 Economic (Chairman: Rep. Jesse P. Wolcott; Vice Chairman: Sen. Ralph Flanders)
 Immigration and Nationality Policy (Chairman: Sen. Arthur V. Watkins; Vice Chairman: Rep. Louis E. Graham)
 Legislative Budget
 The Library
 Navajo-Hopi Indian Administration
 Printing (Chairman: Sen. William E. Jenner; Vice Chairman: Rep. Karl M. LeCompte)
 Railroad Retirement Legislation
 Reduction of Nonessential Federal Expenditures (Chairman: Sen. Harry F. Byrd; Vice Chairman: Rep. Daniel A. Reed)
 Taxation (Chairman: Rep. Daniel A. Reed; Vice Chairman: Sen. Eugene D. Millikin)

Employees

Legislative branch agency directors 
 Architect of the Capitol: David Lynn (January 3, 1953 – September 30, 1954); J. George Stewart (September 30, 1954 – January 3, 1955)
 Attending Physician of the United States Congress: George Calver
 Comptroller General of the United States: Lindsay C. Warren, until April 30, 1954 
 Joseph Campbell, from December 14, 1954
 Librarian of Congress: Luther H. Evans, until 1953 
 Lawrence Quincy Mumford, from 1954
 Public Printer of the United States: John J. Deviny, until 1953
 Raymond Blattenberger, from 1953

Senate 
 Chaplain: Frederick Brown Harris (Methodist)
 Parliamentarian: Charles Watkins
 Secretary: J. Mark Trice
 Librarian: Sterling Dean, until 1954 
 Gus J. Miller (acting), from 1954
 Secretary for the Majority: William T. Reed
 Secretary for the Minority: Felton McLellan Johnston
 Sergeant at Arms: Forest A. Harness

House of Representatives 
 Chaplain: Bernard Braskamp (Presbyterian)
 Clerk: Lyle O. Snader
 Doorkeeper: Tom Kennamer
 Parliamentarian: Lewis Deschler
 Postmaster: Beecher Hess
 Reading Clerks: George J. Maurer (D) and Alney E. Chaffee (R)
 Sergeant at Arms: William F. Russell, died July 7, 1953
 Lyle O. Snader, July 8, 1953 – September 15, 1953
 William R. Bonsell, starting September 15, 1953

See also 

 1952 United States elections (elections leading to this Congress)
 1952 United States presidential election
 1952 United States Senate elections
 1952 United States House of Representatives elections
 1954 United States elections (elections during this Congress, leading to the next Congress)
 1954 United States Senate elections
 1954 United States House of Representatives elections

Notes

References

External links